is a Japanese voice actress who is currently part of Office Osawa.

Filmography

Television

Video games
Armored Core: Last Raven (2005) – Zinaida
Guilty Gear Xrd Rev 2 (2017) – Baiken
Samurai Shodown (2021) – Baiken
The King of Fighters All Star (2021) – Baiken
Guilty Gear -STRIVE- (2022) – Baiken
Stranger of Paradise: Final Fantasy Origin (2022) – Sophia

Dubbing

References

External links
 

1969 births
Living people
Voice actresses from Tokyo
Japanese video game actresses
Japanese voice actresses
20th-century Japanese actresses
21st-century Japanese actresses